Maiwand is a historical city in Afghanistan. The Sufi saint Hazrat Lal Shahbaz Qalandar was born here early in the twelfth century in 1177 CE.

References 

Populated places in Afghanistan
Lal Shahbaz Qalandar